The Women's trap event at the 2008 Olympic Games took place on August 11, 2008 at the Beijing Shooting Range Clay Target Field.

The event consisted of two rounds: a qualifier and a final. In the qualifier, each shooter fired 3 sets of 25 targets in trap shooting, with 10 targets being thrown to the left, 10 to the right, and 5 straight-away in each set. The shooters could take two shots at each target.

The top 6 shooters in the qualifying round moved on to the final round. There, they fired one additional round of 25 targets, where only one shot could be taken at each target. The total score from all 100 targets was used to determine final ranking. Ties are broken using a shoot-off; additional shots are fired one at a time until there is no longer a tie.

Records
Prior to this competition, the existing world and Olympic records were as follows.

During the competition, Satu Mäkelä-Nummela established a new final Olympic record after the final rules had been changed to only allow one shot per target.

Qualification round
The qualification round was held between 09:00 and 13:30 China Standard Time (UTC+8).

Q Qualified for final

Final
The final was held at 15:00 China Standard Time (UTC+8).

OR Olympic record

Shooting at the 2008 Summer Olympics
Olymp
Women's events at the 2008 Summer Olympics